Epistrophy & Now's the Time (reissued as Epistrophy) is a live album by bassist Richard Davis recorded in 1972 and released on the Muse label. It was the second album released on the label.

Reception
Allmusic awarded the album 4 stars with a review stating: "These very unpredictable renditions reward repeated listenings".

Track listing 
All compositions by Richard Davis except as indicated
 "Epistrophy" (Kenny Clarke, Thelonious Monk) - 22:56   
 "Now's the Time" (Charlie Parker) - 22:31   
 "Highest Mountain" - 17:31 Bonus track on CD reissue

Personnel 
Richard Davis - bass
Marvin Peterson - trumpet
Clifford Jordan - tenor saxophone
Joe Bonner - piano
Freddie Waits - drums

References 

Richard Davis (bassist) live albums
1972 live albums
Muse Records live albums
Albums produced by Don Schlitten